Sa'adu Zungur University Gadau (SAZUG) (formerly Bauchi State University Gadau) is a state-owned university located in Bauchi State, Nigeria. Its main campus is in Gadau, with other campuses in Misau and Bauchi.

History

After becoming independent in 1960, Nigeria had only one university at Ibadan, which was an affiliate of the University of London. The Ashby Commission, set up in 1959 to advise the Government on the needs for tertiary education recommended the establishment of what is today referred to as 'First Generation Universities': the University of Ibadan, University of Ife, University of Lagos, and Ahmadu Bello University, Zaria.  By the 1970s, the projections of the Ashby Commission report were found to be unrealistic, particularly on student enrollment and course offerings, motivating the establishment of the so-called 'Second Generation Universities'. By the early 1980s, the Federal Government had attempted to establish a university in each of the then 19 States. The continued demand for tertiary education led to the liberalization of the federal monopoly on establishing universities, allowing the States to establish their own universities.

In 2007, the former State Governor Ahmad Adamu Muazu created a Planning and Implementation Committee. In October 2008, Governor Isa Yuguda initiated another committee to resume the effort. In June 2009, an Implementation Committee proceeded, building on the previous committees' work. After the committee's review of the acquisition and improvement of the campus sites at Gadau (Azare), Misau, and Bauchi, the Government awarded several contracts for the renovation of the campuses. The Government then engaged a Lagos-based firm to produce the Bauchi State University Academic Brief, a Master Plan, and a Strategic Plan to cover its 25-year development plan. The law establishing the university was passed by the Bauchi State House of Assembly and approved by Governor Isa Yuguda on 31 December 2010.

Library

Campuses and departments 

The university has three campuses:

 Gadau (Azare), the main campus and location of the administration
 Misau Campus
 Bauchi Campus

Faculties

 Gadau Campus
 School of Basic and Remedial Studies
 Faculty of Art
 Faculty of Education
 Faculty of Agriculture
 Faculty of Basic Medical Sciences
 Faculty of Pharmaceutical Sciences
 Faculty of Science
 Misau Campus 

 Faculty of Law
 Bauchi Campus
 Faculty of Social Science
 Faculty of Management Science

By the end of the fourth phase of development (2026/27 - 2030/31) the university is expected to have the following faculties:

 Gadau Campus
 Faculty of Arts
 Faculty of Education
 Faculty of Science
 School of Basic and Remedial Studies
 Faculty of Pharmaceutical Sciences
 Misau Campus
 Faculty of Law
 Bauchi Campus
 Faculty of Management Sciences
 Faculty of Social Sciences
 Faculty of Environmental Sciences

Notes
 Bauchi State University "Academic-Brief 2011/12-2020/21" Volume I, Feb. 2013
 Review of Basug, 3rd Meeting with TOROSA By Ibrahim Baba Ahmed(Marel), chairman of the committee,12/5/2015.

References

External links

Universities and colleges in Nigeria
Educational institutions established in 2011
2011 establishments in Nigeria